Koushik Ghosh (born 22 October 1992) is an Indian cricketer. He made his first-class debut on 18 January 2014, for Bengal in the 2013–14 Ranji Trophy.

References

External links
 

1992 births
Living people
Indian cricketers
Bengal cricketers
Place of birth missing (living people)